Paraffin may refer to:

Substances
 Paraffin wax, a white or colorless soft solid that is used as a lubricant and for other applications
 Liquid paraffin (drug), a very highly refined mineral oil used in cosmetics and for medical purposes
 Alkane, a saturated hydrocarbon
 Kerosene, a fuel that is also known as paraffin
 Mineral oil, any of various colorless, odorless, light mixtures of alkanes in the C15 to C40 range from a non-vegetable (mineral) source, particularly a distillate of petroleum
 Petroleum jelly, also called soft paraffin
 Tractor vaporizing oil, a fuel for petrol-paraffin engines

Other uses
 "Paraffin" (song) the first single off the 1995 album Salt Peter by Ruby
 Paraffin - WiX command-line tool, a free software toolset that builds Windows Installer (MSI) packages from an XML document
 Paraffin (album)

See also
 Kerosene (disambiguation)
 Paraffin oil (disambiguation)
 Paraffin test